Carex notha is a tussock-forming species of perennial sedge in the family Cyperaceae. It is native to parts of the Himalayas.

See also
List of Carex species

References

notha
Plants described in 1837
Taxa named by Carl Sigismund Kunth
Flora of Nepal